Hume (Home  is an older variant spelling of Hume, still used for the senior branches of the family) is a Scottish surname that derives from Hume Castle, Berwickshire, and its adjacent estates. The name may refer to: 
 
 Abraham Hume (disambiguation)
Sir Abraham Hume, 1st Baronet (1703–1772), MP for Steyning 
Sir Abraham Hume, 2nd Baronet (1749–1838)
Abraham Hume (priest) (1814–1884), English priest and antiquary
Abraham Hume (cricketer) (1819–1888), English clergyman and cricketer
 Alan Hume (1924–2010), English cinematographer
 Alexander Hume (1558–1609) Scottish poet
 Allan Octavian Hume (1829–1912), British administrator in India
 Andrew Hume, Australian convict, led failed search for Ludwig Leichhardt expedition
 Basil Hume (1923–1999), English Roman Catholic bishop, Archbishop of Westminster
 Benita Hume (1906–1967), British film actress
 Bill Hume (footballer) (1937–2005), English-born soccer player with New Zealand and Australia
 Bill Hume (cartoonist) (1916–2009), American artist, art director, and newspaper man
 Billy Hume (1935–1990), Scottish footballer
 Bobby Hume (1941–1997), Scottish footballer
 Brit Hume Alexander Britton Hume (born 1943), American journalist with Fox News
 Caroline Howard Hume (a.k.a. Betty Hume) (1909–2008), American philanthropist and art collector
 David Hume (disambiguation)
 David Hume of Godscroft (1558–1629), Scottish historian and political theorist
 David Hume (advocate) (1757–1838), Scottish jurist and nephew of the philosopher
 David Hume (explorer) (1796–1864), South African explorer and big-game hunter
 David Hume (footballer) (1898–1964), Australian footballer
 David Hume Kennerly (born 1947), American Pulitzer–winning photographer
 David M. Hume (1917–1973), American doctor and pioneer in kidney disease research and treatment
 Donald Hume (disambiguation)
 Donald Hume (rower) (1915–2001), American rower in the 1936 Olympics
 Donald C. Hume (1907–1986), English badminton player
 Ernest Hume (1869–1912), Australian cricketer
 Gene Sheldon Eugene Hume (1908–1982), American mime actor
 Fergus Hume (1859–1932), English novelist
 Fred Hume (disambiguation)
 Fred Hume (rugby league) (1898–1978), Australian rugby league player
 Fred Hume (American football), American college football quarterback
 Frederick Hume (1892–1967), mayor of Vancouver, British Columbia
 Gary Hume, British artist
 George Hume (disambiguation)
 Sir George Hume, 1st Baronet, Scottish-Irish baronet
 George Hume (politician) (1866–1946), British politician and leader of the London County Council
 George Hume (cricketer) (1800–1872), English cricketer
 George H. Hume, American heir, businessman and philanthropist
 George Sherwood Hume (1893–1965), Canadian geologist
 George Steuart Hume (1747–1788), Maryland physician and landowner
 Graham Hume, South African cricketer
 Hamilton Hume (1797–1873), Australian explorer
 Iain Hume (born 1983), Scottish-Canadian footballer
 Ian Hume (born 1948), Scottish footballer
 J. Ord Hume (1864–1932), English brass band conductor and composer
 James Hume (disambiguation), several people
 James Hume (architect) (1798–1868), in Sydney, Australia
 James Hume (cricketer) (1858–1909), Scots-born New Zealand cricketer
 James Hume (magistrate) (1808–1862), British political commentator in Calcutta
 James Hume (mathematician) (fl. 1639), Scotsman credited with modern exponential notation
 James Hume (rugby union) (born 1998), Irish rugby union player
 James Hume (superintendent) (1823–1896), New Zealand asylum superintendent
 James B. Hume (1827–1904), lawman in the American West
 James Deacon Hume (1774–1842), English official, economic writer and advocate of free trade
 Jaquelin H. Hume (a.k.a. Jack Hume) (1905–1991), co-founder Basic American Foods, philanthropist 
 Jim Hume (born 1962), Scottish Liberal Democrat politician
 Jock Hume (1885–1962), Scottish footballer with Aberdeen
 John Hume (disambiguation)
Sir John Hume, 2nd Baronet (died 1695), Irish landowner
John Hume (bishop) (c. 1706–1782), English bishop
John Hume (priest) (1743–1818), Dean of the Church of Ireland
John Basil Hume (1893–1974), British surgeon and lecturer in anatomy
John Frederick Hume (1860–1935), miner and political figure in British Columbia
John Law Hume (1890–1912), Scottish violinist on the RMS Titanic
John R. Hume, Scottish architectural historian
John Robert Hume (c. 1781–1857), Scottish surgeon and physician
John Walter Hulme (1805–1861), first Chief Justice of Hong Kong
 Jon Hume (born 1983), New Zealand musician
 Joseph Hume (1777–1855), Scottish doctor and Member of Parliament
 Leslie P. Hume, American historian and philanthropist
 Martin Andrew Sharp Hume (1847–1910), born Martin Sharp (journalist), English historian
 Mick Hume (born 1959), British journalist, editor of Spiked Online Magazine
 Patrick Hume (disambiguation)
 Patrick Hume of Polwarth (c. 1550–1609), Scottish courtier and poet of the Castalian Band
 Patrick Hume, 1st Earl of Marchmont (1641–1724), Scottish statesman
 Patrick Hume (editor) (fl. 1695), Scottish schoolmaster in London
 Paul Hume (music critic) (1915–2001), music critic for the Washington Post
 Peter Hume (politician), Canadian politician
 Rob Hume, English ornithological writer
 Rowena Hume (1877–1966), Canadian obstetrician
 Tobias Hume (c. 1569–1645), English composer, viola player and soldier
 Walter Reginald Hume (1873–1943), Australian inventor and concrete pipe manufacturer
 William Hume (disambiguation)
William Hume (Cape politician) (1837–1916), politician of the Cape Colony
William Errington Hume (1879–1960), English physician
William H. Hume, American architect in New York City
William J. Hume, American heir, businessman and conservative philanthropist
William Fraser Hume (1867–1949), British geologist
 Willie Hume (1862–1941), cyclist, first ever winner on Dunlop pneumatic tyres

See also
Home (surname)

Scottish surnames
Surnames of Lowland Scottish origin